Elsa Gretškina (born Elsa Krensman; 15 April 1932 – 20 October 2014) was a Soviet-Estonian politician (Communist).

She served as Minister of Education of the Estonian Soviet Socialist Republic from 1980 until 1988.

References

1932 births
2014 deaths
20th-century Estonian women politicians
Soviet women in politics
Estonian communists
Women government ministers of Estonia
Tallinn University alumni
Burials at Metsakalmistu